Rudolph John Haluza (July 5, 1931 – September 27, 2021) was an American racewalker who competed in the 1960 Summer Olympics and in the 1968 Summer Olympics. He was born  in Middletown, New York. He grew up in Queens and after college entered the Air Force and became a pilot for United Airlines.

References

1931 births
2021 deaths
American male racewalkers
Olympic track and field athletes of the United States
Athletes (track and field) at the 1960 Summer Olympics
Athletes (track and field) at the 1968 Summer Olympics
People from Middletown, Orange County, New York
Sportspeople from the New York metropolitan area
Track and field athletes from New York (state)